Prosthogonimus ovatus is a species of a trematodes, or fluke worms, in the family Prosthogonimidae.

Life cycle
The first intermediate hosts of Prosthogonimus ovatus include freshwater snails:
 Anisus spirorbis
 Bithynia leachii
 Bithynia tentaculata
 Planorbarius corneus

The definitive host lives in the oviducts of corn crake Crex crex.

References

External links
 

Plagiorchiida
Taxa named by Karl Rudolphi